Eyton is a village and parish in Herefordshire, England. The village church is Norman and dedicated to All Saints. The parish had a population of 124 at the time of the 2011 census.

Eyton is mentioned in the Domesday Book as "Ettone" and was part of the manor of Leominster.

In 1552 the Elizabethan writer and geographer Richard Hakluyt, known for his compilations of documents on contemporary voyages of exploration and for promoting the settlement of North America by the English, was born here.

Notes and references

Villages in Herefordshire